Atul Mongia is a creator, writer, director, producer and acting mentor based in Mumbai. He was the showrunner, creator, head writer and co-director of the show MAI which was ranked #1 on Netflix for weeks in the Top Ten Show of India. He's associated with Hindi cinema for a period spanning two decades with films like Queen, Lootera, Titli (2014 film), Love Sex Aur Dhokha, Queen (2013 film), Shor in the City, Ragini MMS, Shanghai (2012 film), Qarib Qarib Singlle, Gully Boy and Gehraiyaan to his credit. His strength lies in training actors and helping the actors deliver more truthful performances. He has also established himself as one of the industry's most acclaimed erstwhile casting directors who introduced actors like Rajkummar Rao, Vikrant Massey, Radhika Apte, Nushrratt Bharuccha to Indian Cinema.

He has helped actors to get into their characters for various projects, the list includes contemporary Indian actors like Anushka Sharma, Alia Bhatt, Ranveer Singh, Raj Kumar Rao, Bhumi Pednekar, Varun Dhawan, Saif Ali Khan, Kriti Sanon, Radhika Apte, Ananya Panday, Sakshi Tanwar, Dia Mirza, Sohum Shah, Raima Sen, Emraan Hashmi, Katrina Kaif, Sidharth Malhotra, Vamika, Arjun Kapoor, Konkona Sen Sharma,  Deepika Padukone, Arjun Rampal, Ileana D'Cruz, Vicky Kaushal, Radhika Madan and Siddhant Chaturvedi.

Early life and career 
Atul has been mentoring actors since 2000. At the age of 21, he taught acting at the accomplished Imago acting school in Delhi, founded by theatre veteran Barry John.

He moved to Mumbai in 2002. For the first few years, in addition to training actors, he shot four independent short films, the last one being produced by director and producer Vikramaditya Motwane. He's been an associate director on Lootera, Ragini MMS and Titli (Cannes, 2014).

In 2004, Atul met Dibakar Banerjee to train actors for his next film, Love Sex Aur Dhoka. Dibakar wanted to cast fresh faces for the film. That's when he asked Atul if he could also do the casting and his journey as a casting director started. Since then he has been a pioneer in conducting acting workshops in Hindi films with more than 50 films to his credit. He has worked with prominent film directors like Zoya Akhtar, Vishal Bhardwaj, Sharat Kataria, Navdeep Singh, Kanu Behl, Reema Kagti, Dibakar Banerjee, Shashanka Ghosh, Laxman Utekar, Honey Trehan, Anvita Dutt, Ashim Ahluwalia, Navdeep Singh, Maneesh Sharma, Raj & DK, Tanuja Chandra, Alankita Shrivastava, Aparna Sen, Ruchi Narain, Kunal Deshmukh, Sudhir Mishra, Vishal Bhardwaj, Aditya Dhar, Ajay Bahl, establishing workshops more as a norm than an exception in Hindi cinema. He has also conducted many public workshops for acting aspirants all over the country as one of the founders of The Artist Collective.

Filmography

References

 https://www.idiva.com/entertainment/bollywood/sakshi-tanwar-shares-her-thoughts-on-playing-sheel-in-mai-and-how-she-prepared-for-it/18033173
 https://www.hindustantimes.com/entertainment/web-series/mai-sakshi-tanwar-atul-mongia-talk-about-why-pineapple-pastry-scene-was-the-best-cliffhanger-ending-and-more-101650644460673.html
 https://www.firstpost.com/entertainment/kiara-advani-on-working-with-kartik-aryan-in-bhool-bhulaiyaa-2-people-have-already-started-calling-us-the-two-ks-10659791.html
 https://instagram.com/theartistcollectiveindia?igshid=NWRhNmQxMjQ=
 https://www.iwmbuzz.com/television/celebrities/atul-mongia-mentor-guru-made-actor-today-mohit-malik/2020/09/05
 https://www.thestatesman.com/entertainment/mai-review-sakshi-tanwar-1503062384.html
 https://mumbaimirror.indiatimes.com/entertainment/bollywood/first-day-first-shot-rajkummar-rao-recalls-his-time-as-a-newbie-on-the-sets-of-love-sex-aur-dhokha/articleshow/71693049.cms
 https://www.india.com/entertainment/dia-mirza-and-mohit-raina-start-preparations-for-zee-5s-original-web-series-kaafir-3619235/
 https://scroll.in/reel/955239/kiara-advani-on-staying-grounded-i-want-to-make-sure-i-am-still-the-person-i-was-before-all-this
 https://www.business-standard.com/article/companies/no-casting-couch-here-s-a-new-crop-to-cast-them-right-110121500102_1.html

External links

 

Living people
Male actors from Mumbai
Indian casting directors
1978 births